Agapanthia korostelevi is a species of beetle in the family Cerambycidae. It was described by Mikhail Leontievich Danilevsky in 1985.

References

korostelevi
Beetles described in 1985